The Journal of Human Rights Practice is a peer reviewed academic journal of human rights practice and activism. It is published by Oxford University Press.

References 

Oxford University Press academic journals
Human rights journals